Weekend with Stars is a 2017 Indian Tamil language talk show which aired on Zee Tamil on every Sunday at 8:30 pm to 10:00 pm (IST). It debuted on 30 April 2017, aired through 23 July 2017. The show was hosted by Tamil actress and director Suhasini Maniratnam. It is based on the Zee Kannada talk show Weekend with Ramesh.

Overview
The format of the show involves achievers from various fields, primarily from Tamil Nadu, being invited and the story of their life being told. The show will feature personalities from the Tamil film industry or celebrities from Tamil Nadu who will talk about their life. The show will also have a surprise as friends and family members join in.

Hosts
 Episodes 01–12: Suhasini Maniratnam
 Episode 13: Archana (with Suhasini Maniratnam as the interview subject)

Episodes

References

External links
 Weekend with Stars at ZEE5

2017 Tamil-language television series debuts
2017 Tamil-language television series endings
Tamil-language television shows
Tamil-language quiz shows
Tamil-language talk shows
Zee Tamil original programming
Television shows set in Tamil Nadu
Tamil-language television series based on Kannada-language television series